Simply Stated is a studio album by American jazz trumpeter Terence Blanchard. The album was released by Columbia Records on May 5, 1992.

Background
Simply Stated marked Blanchard's second album as a band leader. Blanchard explained that the album is a tribute to Miles Davis. The album contains four famous jazz standards and four Blanchard's original compositions. The reached the top 10 on the Billboard traditional jazz charts.

Critical reception
Nick Deriso of Something Else Reviews wrote, "This record was, Blanchard told me, his love letter to Miles Davis. In retrospect, it was the beginning of his ascension from young lion into modern standard bearer, too... "Simply Stated," pleasant if never really triumphant, is centered by sharp if respectful renditions of a challenging Davis-associated number "Dear Old Stockholm" and then on "Sleepy Time Down South." Blanchard, working his way back from a problem with his embouchure, even then blended enough artistry to draw second glances. As perhaps overly careful as this album sometimes was, it actually marked the starting point in a series giant steps for Blanchard as an artist.

Scott Yanow of AllMusic wrote, "Terence Blanchard is in top form throughout this highly enjoyable outing... The music is tied to the hard bop tradition yet is quite fresh and open to more modern influences. Recommended."

Track listing

Personnel
Antonio Hart – alto saxophone (track three)
Rodney Whitaker – double bass
Billy Kilson – drums (track seven)
Troy Davis – cymbals, drums 
Dr. George Butler – executive producer
Bruce Barth – piano
Terence Blanchard – producer, trumpet, piano (solo) (track five)
Sam Newsome – tenor saxophone

Chart performance

References

External links

1992 albums
Terence Blanchard albums
Columbia Records albums
Jazz albums by American artists